Fujiang Village, is a village in Tonggong Township, Changshan County, Quzhou, Zhejiang province, China.

References

External links
  Fujiang Village
 About Fujiang
 Fujiang

Villages in China
Quzhou